The 2015 Lewes District Council election took place on 7 May 2015 to elect members of Lewes District Council in England. This was on the same day as other local elections.

Results summary

Ward results
Sitting councillors are marked with an asterisk (*).

Barcombe & Hamsey

Chailey & Wivelsfield

Ditchling & Westmeston

East Saltdean & Telscome Cliffs

Kingston

Lewes Bridge

Lewes Castle

Lewes Priory

Newhaven Denton & Meeching

Newhaven Valley

Newick

Ouse Valley & Ringmer

Peacehaven East

Peacehaven North

Peacehaven West

Plumpton, Streat, East Chiltington & St John (Without)

Seaford Central

Seaford East

Seaford North

Seaford South

Seaford West

References

2015 English local elections
May 2015 events in the United Kingdom
2015
2010s in East Sussex